Jobos may refer to:

Places
Jobos, Guayama, Puerto Rico, a barrio
Jobos, Isabela, Puerto Rico, a barrio